Benjamin George Cabango (born 30 May 2000) is a Welsh professional footballer who plays as a defender for Swansea City and the  Wales national team.

Early life
Cabango was born in Cardiff to an Angolan father and a Welsh mother. He has a younger brother named Theo who plays rugby union for Cardiff. He attended Ysgol Gyfun Gymraeg Plasmawr, a Welsh language comprehensive school.

Club career
Cabango began his career as a youth player with local amateur side Maindy Corries, where his father Paolo was a coach, before joining the youth academy at Newport County, where he played from under-13 to under-15 levels. He moved to the academy at Swansea City where he captained the under-19 side to win the FAW Welsh Youth Cup in 2018 and helped the under-23 side reach the final of the Premier League Cup.

In June 2018, Cabango signed for reigning Welsh Premier League champions The New Saints on a six-month loan deal. He made his senior debut for the side in a 5–0 defeat to Macedonian side KF Shkëndija in the first leg of the first qualifying round of the UEFA Champions League. In the return leg, Cabango scored his first senior goal as The New Saints won 4–0 but were eliminated on aggregate.

On 13 August 2019, he made his professional debut for Swansea in a 3–1 victory over Northampton Town in the first round of the League Cup. He made his league debut as a substitute against Huddersfield Town on 26 November 2019.

International career
Cabango made his senior Wales international debut as a second-half substitute during the team's UEFA Nations League League B match against Finland on 3 September 2020, which Wales won 1–0. In May 2021 he was selected for the Wales squad for the delayed UEFA Euro 2020 tournament. In November 2022 he was named in the Wales squad for the 2022 FIFA World Cup in Qatar.

Personal life
Ben Cabango is the elder brother of professional rugby union player Theo Cabango.

Career statistics

References

External links

2000 births
Living people
Footballers from Cardiff
Association football defenders
Welsh footballers
Wales youth international footballers
Welsh people of Angolan descent
Newport County A.F.C. players
Swansea City A.F.C. players
The New Saints F.C. players
Cymru Premier players
English Football League players
Wales under-21 international footballers
Wales international footballers
UEFA Euro 2020 players
2022 FIFA World Cup players